Florida Philosophical Review  is the journal of the Florida Philosophical Association, an anonymously refereed electronic journal published biannually by the University of Central Florida Department of Philosophy.

External links 
Florida Philosophical Review website

Philosophy journals
Mass media in Florida
Biannual journals